Fascist Italy may refer to:
 Fascist Italy (1922–1943), the Kingdom of Italy under Fascism, ruled by the National Fascist Party under Benito Mussolini
 Italian Social Republic, a puppet state of Nazi Germany, ruled by the Republican Fascist Party under Benito Mussolini from 1943 to 1945

See also 
 Italian fascism